Maria Sharapova defeated Ana Ivanovic in the final, 7–5, 6–3 to win the women's singles tennis title at the 2008 Australian Open. It was her third major singles title. She did not lose a set during the tournament or face a tiebreak in any set. Sharapova also became the first Russian woman to win the title. It was Ivanovic's second runner-up finish in as many major finals, though she would win the French Open a few months later.

Serena Williams was the defending champion, but was defeated in the quarterfinals by Jelena Janković.

Justine Henin, whose consecutive streak of 33 match wins dated back at the 2007 Rogers Cup, lost in the quarterfinals to Sharapova.

Agnieszka Radwańska became the first Polish player to reach the quarterfinals in the Open era, the first player was to do so since Jadwiga Jędrzejowska in the 1939 Wimbledon Championships.

This was the first Australian Open appearance for future champion Caroline Wozniacki, who lost to Ivanovic in the fourth round.

Seeds

Qualifying

Draw

Finals

Top half

Section 1

Section 2

Section 3

Section 4

Bottom half

Section 5

Section 6

Section 7

Section 8

Championship match statistics

External links
 2008 Australian Open – Women's draws and results at the International Tennis Federation

Women's Singles
Australian Open (tennis) by year – Women's singles
2008 in Australian women's sport